Gayathri is a 1977 Indian Tamil-language film directed by R. Pattabhiraman and written by Panchu Arunachalam. It stars Jaishankar, Rajinikanth and Sridevi. The film was based on the novel of the same name by Sujatha. It was released on 7 October 1977.

Plot 

Rajarathnam is a rich man who lives with his sister Sarasu and a young house maid in Madras.

His sister arranges a marriage for him with Gayathri, a sixteen-year old who lives in Tiruchirappalli. Soon after they marry, Gayathri moves to Rajarathnam's house and realises that the family has dark secrets.

Rajarathnam is actually a blue-film producer who records pornographic movies - he secretly records himself and his new wife in their bedroom scenes without her knowledge, and sells the movies on the black market. Gayathri initially gives Rajarathnam the benefit of the doubt, but later discovers that Rajarathnam is already married to another woman, who is now insane.

Ganesh, a friend of the writer Chellappa, tries to free Gayathri from the hands of Rajarathnam, without avail.

Cast 
Jaishankar as Ganesh
Rajinikanth as Rajarathnam
Sridevi as Gaayathri
Rajasulochana as Sarasu
M. N. Rajam as Gaayathri's mother
Rajee as Indra
Rajeshwari as Lalitha
S. A. Ashokan as Shama Iyer
Vennira Aadai Moorthy as Chellappa
Delhi Kumar as Gaayathri's father

Production 
Gaayathri is based on Sujatha's novel of the same name, and was conceived during the Emergency. The screenplay was written by Panchu Arunachalam.

Soundtrack 
The soundtrack was composed by Ilaiyaraaja, with lyrics by Panchu Arunachalam. Sujatha Mohan made her debut as a playback singer through this film.

References

Bibliography

External links 
 

1970s Tamil-language films
1977 films
Films based on Indian novels
Films scored by Ilaiyaraaja
Films with screenplays by Panchu Arunachalam
Indian black-and-white films